Frozen Lake is a lake in Flathead County, Montana, in the United States. The northern part of the lake is in British Columbia, Canada.

Frozen Lake was named from its tendency to freeze over.

See also
List of lakes in Montana
List of lakes in Flathead County, Montana (A-L)

References

Lakes of Montana
Lakes of British Columbia
Bodies of water of Flathead County, Montana
International lakes of North America